Swimming was inducted at the Youth Olympic Games at the inaugural edition in 2010.

Summary

Medal table
As of the 2018 Summer Youth Olympics.

See also
Swimming at the Summer Olympics
FINA World Junior Swimming Championships

References

 
Sports at the Summer Youth Olympics
Youth Olympic Games